Alexandra Yurievna "Sasha" Aikhenvald (Eichenwald)  is a Russian Australian linguist specialising in linguistic typology and the Arawak language family (including Tariana) of the Brazilian Amazon basin. She is a professor at the James Cook University.

Biography
Alexandra Aikhenvald was born to a grandson of Yuly Aykhenvald; Natalia Shvedova was her paternal aunt. She was fascinated by languages from early childhood, picking up some Spanish from her parents' Spanish flatmate, and dreaming of majoring in Latin and Classical studies in university. A friend taught her German during her high school years, and she also mastered French.

Aikhenvald earned her undergraduate degree from Moscow State University, with a thesis on Anatolian languages (Hittite). She also studied Sanskrit, Akkadian, Lithuanian, Finnish, Hungarian, Arabic, Italian and Ancient Greek. Outside of her classes, she learned Estonian and Hebrew. After graduation, she joined the research staff of the Institute of Oriental Studies of the USSR Academy of Sciences, where she earned her Cand. Sc. degree (Soviet equivalent of Ph.D.) in 1984 with a thesis on the "Structural and Typological Classification of Berber Languages" (1984). She published the first Russian grammar of modern Hebrew in 1985. She also mastered Yiddish, the language of her grandparents, which was, however, never spoken at home.

In 1989–1992, Aikhenvald did research work in Brazil, where she mastered Portuguese, learnt five Brazilian Indian languages, and wrote a grammar of the Tariana language. In 1993 she started her work in Australia, first at Australian National University, later at La Trobe University.

In 1996, the expert on Australian aboriginal languages R. M. W. Dixon and Aikhenvald established the Research Centre for Linguistic Typology at Australian National University in Canberra. On January 1, 2000, the center relocated to La Trobe University in Melbourne. Dixon and Aikhenvald both resigned in May 2008. In January 2009, she became a professor at the James Cook University, where she and R. M. W. Dixon founded The Language and Culture Research Group.

She speaks Tok Pisin, and has written a grammar of the Sepik language Manambu, a language she self-professedly occasionally dreams in.

Research work
Aikhenvald has published work on Berber languages, Modern and Classical Hebrew, Ndu languages (specifically Manambu of East Sepik Province of Papua New Guinea), alongside a number of articles and monographs on various aspects of linguistic typology.

She has worked on language contact, with reference to the multilingual area of the Vaupés River Basin. She has established a typology of classifiers and worked out parameters for the typology of evidentials as grammatical markers of information sources. In addition, she authored a comprehensive grammar of Warekena and of Tariana, both Arawak languages, in addition to a Tariana–Portuguese dictionary (available online).

Awards and honors
Aikhenvald was elected Fellow of the Australian Academy of the Humanities in 1999. In 2012, she was awarded an Australian Laureate Fellowship.

Publications
 Non-canonical marking of subjects and objects, 2001
 Areal diffusion and genetic inheritance : problems in comparative linguistics, 2001
 Evidentiality, 2004
 The Manambu language of East Sepik, Papua New Guinea, 2008
 Imperatives and commands, 2010

References

External links
A.Y. Aikhenvald's page at JCU; includes CV
Sasha (Alexandra) Aikhenvald's Linguistics Research - Dr. Aikhenvald's own site
For want of a word - New Scientist magazine interview
Telling the Truth in Tariana - ABC radio documentary transcript

Linguists from Russia
Russian Jews
Australian Jews
Linguists from Australia
Australian people of Russian-Jewish descent
Soviet emigrants to Australia
Living people
Academic staff of La Trobe University
Academic staff of James Cook University
Academic staff of the Australian National University
Linguists of Papuan languages
Linguists of Sepik languages
Linguists of Arawakan languages
Linguists of Anatolian languages
Paleolinguists
Women linguists
1957 births
Linguists of indigenous languages of South America
Australian women academics
Fellows of the Australian Academy of the Humanities